Alcidodes virgatus, is a species of weevil found in Sri Lanka.

Description
This very small species has a body length is about 3.8 to 4.5 mm. Body blackish-brown or black. Body covered with yellowish scales. Elytral spaces are reddish. Elytra covered with yellowish and blackish brown scales. Each scale consists of a short brush-shaped tufts of hair. Pronotum with a median stripes. Each wing cover with a total of 3 yellowish stripes. Proboscis shorter than the pronotum, but clearly curved downwards. Forehead flat, and densely dotted. Pronotum transverse. Elytra much wider than the pronotum. Legs are stocky with short, curved, black bristles and very coarse puncture.

References 

Curculionidae
Insects of Sri Lanka
Beetles described in 1960